Shurab-e Tangazi Rural District is in the Central District of Kuhrang County, Chaharmahal and Bakhtiari province, Iran. At the census of 2006, its population was 5,562 in 1,068 households; there were 4,537 inhabitants in 1,058 households at the following census of 2011; and in the most recent census of 2016, the population of the rural district was 5,431 in 1,489 households. The largest of its 46 villages was Shahrak-e Emam Hoseyn, with 797 people.

References 

Kuhrang County

Rural Districts of Chaharmahal and Bakhtiari Province

Populated places in Chaharmahal and Bakhtiari Province

Populated places in Kuhrang County